Ctenophora elegans is a species of true crane fly found in Europe.

References

External links 

 Ctenophora elegans at insectoid.info

Tipulidae
Insects described in 1818
Nematoceran flies of Europe
Taxa named by Johann Wilhelm Meigen